The 2013 NCAA Division II football season, part of college football in the United States organized by the National Collegiate Athletic Association at the Division II level, began on August 31, 2013, and concluded with the National Championship Game of the NCAA Division II Football Championship on December 21, 2013, at Braly Municipal Stadium in Florence, Alabama. This was the final championship played in Florence, after twenty-eight straight finals, before the game moves to Sporting Park in Kansas City, Kansas. The Northwest Missouri State Bearcats defeated the Lenoir–Rhyne Bears, 43–28, to win their fourth national title.

The 2013 Harlon Hill Trophy was awarded to running back Franklyn Quiteh from Bloomsburg.

Conference and program changes
It was the first season for the Mountain East Conference, a league founded by eight schools that announced in June 2012 that they would leave the West Virginia Intercollegiate Athletic Conference (WVIAC)—a move that led to the demise of the WVIAC. These eight schools were soon joined by three other football-playing schools, plus one non-football WVIAC member that had been left out of the original split.

Black Hills State, Lindenwood, Malone, McKendree, South Dakota Mines, and Walsh completed their transitions to Division II and became eligible for the postseason.

Conference standings

Super Region 1

Super Region 2

Super Region 3

Super Region 4

Conference summaries

Postseason

The 2013 NCAA Division II National Football Championship playoffs involved 24 schools playing in a single-elimination tournament to determine the national champion of men's NCAA Division II college football.
The tournament began on November 23, 2013 and concluded on December 21, 2013 with the 2013 NCAA Division II National Football Championship game at Braly Municipal Stadium near the campus of the University of North Alabama in Florence, Alabama.

Format
Two teams in each super regional earned first-round byes.  The first-round winners advanced to face a bye team in their super regional. 
Second-round winners met in the quarterfinals and quarterfinal winners advanced to play in the semifinals.  First-round, second-round, quarterfinal and semifinal games were played on the campus of one of the competing institutions as determined by the NCAA Division II Football Committee.  The home team at the championship was determined by the Division II Football Committee and the Shoals National Championship Committee.

Participants

Teams

Bids by conference

Bracket

* Home team     Winner

Playoff standings

See also
2013 NCAA Division I FBS football season
2013 NCAA Division I FCS football season
2013 NCAA Division III football season
2013 NAIA football season

References

External links
 www.ncaa.com --Championship game play-by-play